Lauridsen Skatepark, at 88,000 square feet, is currently (as of July 2021) the largest public skatepark in the United States, located on the Des Moines River, in Des Moines, Iowa.

The Lauridsen Skatepark held the only Olympic skateboarding qualifying event in North America for the 2021 Olympics.

The park has been used for competitions and exhibitions. Citizens have painted several murals on it since it opened.

References

Skateparks in the United States
Sports venues in Greater Des Moines
Year of establishment missing